Third Lake is a lake in the Town of Webb in Herkimer County, New York, by the hamlet of Old Forge. Third Lake is part of the Fulton Chain of Lakes.

References

Lakes of New York (state)
Lakes of Herkimer County, New York